Roman Candle is the debut studio album by American singer-songwriter Elliott Smith. It was recorded in late 1993 and released on July 14, 1994 by record label Cavity Search.

Background and recording 
Roman Candle was recorded and released while Smith was still in Heatmiser. According to Benjamin Nugent's biography Elliott Smith and the Big Nothing, Smith recorded the album in the basement of the home of then-girlfriend and Heatmiser manager JJ Gonson.

The album was never intended for release, as Smith only expected to get a deal for a 7" single; however, after Gonson played the album for Cavity Search, they immediately requested permission to release it in its entirety. Smith at first hesitated, and then allowed permission.

Content 
The album has a raw, homemade sound, with Smith playing each instrument and recording it on his four-track recorder. Additionally, he used a Shure SM57 and an inexpensive RadioShack dynamic microphone to capture the sound.

The song Condor Ave may refer to an avenue of the same name in Homestead, Portland, Oregon.

The front cover features a photograph of Neil Gust (of Heatmiser) and friend Amy Dalsimer, taken by Gonson. Smith chose the image because he "liked the way the picture looked as a 'piece of art'".

Release 
Roman Candle was released on July 14, 1994.

Roman Candle was reissued on April 6, 2010 by record label Kill Rock Stars. It was remastered by Larry Crane, with the original mixes by Smith remaining intact. On the official press release on Sweetadeline.net, Crane said of the remaster:

The intention that I had was to make the album more listenable. I felt that a lot of the guitar "squeaks" were jarring and very loud, and that many of the hard consonants and "s" sounds were jarring and scratchy sounding. I felt by reducing these noises that the music would become more inviting and the sound would serve the songs better. When I went to Roger Seibel's SAE Mastering, he proceeded to equalize the tracks a small amount and to make the volume slightly louder. We never tried to make this CD as loud as current, over-limited trends, but just to match the volume of the rest of Elliott's KRS catalog in a graceful way. Please note that none of this album is "remixed" from the master tapes – it is still composed of the mixes Elliott created himself.

Reception 

According to Nugent, the response to Roman Candle was mixed, with some passing it off as being derivative of Simon & Garfunkel, though Roman Candle has since been well received by critics. In its retrospective review, BBC Music opined that the album "remains a searingly honest and decisive collection. As a genesis of exceptional talent it is flawless, and heartbreakingly so." Consequence of Sound called the album "far from a genius effort, but nonetheless an important solo performance pointing towards where his many strengths and few weaknesses as a singer and songwriter were." Pitchfork'' has described the album's musical style as "lo-fi folk".

Track listing

Personnel 

 Elliott Smith – acoustic guitars, vocals, record producer, electric guitar ("Roman Candle", "Last Call", "Kiwi Maddog 20/20"), harmonica ("No Name #2")
 
 Additional personnel

 Kid Tulsa (Pete Krebs) – snare and cymbal ("No Name #1", "Kiwi Maddog 20/20")

 Technical

 Tony Lash – mixing assistance
 Neil Gust – sleeve design and photography
 JJ Gonson – album cover photography
 Peter Hawkinson – technician

References

External links 

 

1994 debut albums
Cavity Search Records albums
Elliott Smith albums